= Urbansee =

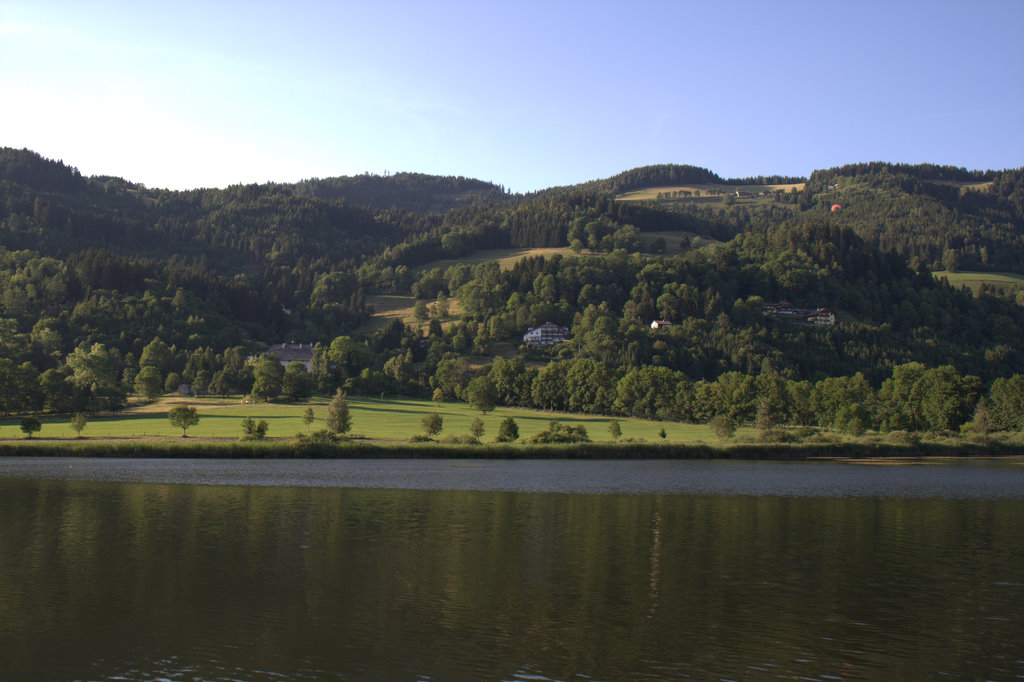

- Location within Austria Location within Kärnten
- Location: Carinthia, Austria
- Coordinates: 46°44′44″N 14°04′44″E
- Type: lake

Urbansee is a lake located in Carinthia, Austria.
